Michael Cavanaugh may refer to:

 Michael Cavanaugh (musician) (born 1972), musician and actor, notable from musical Movin' Out
 Michael Cavanaugh (actor) (born 1942), American TV and film actor, notable for 24
 Mike Cavanaugh, American ice hockey coach and player

See also
 Michael Cavanagh (disambiguation)
 Michael Kavanagh (disambiguation)